Kanika Dewan is an interior designer and World Economic Forum Young Global Leader. She is a former investment banker and campaigner against corruption. She has been involved with the development of Terminal 3 at Indira Gandhi International Airport. She is the president of Bahrain-based natural resources conglomerate Bramco and founder of Ka Design Atelier.

Early life and education 
Dewan was born in Kolkata. Dewan moved to Bahrain when she was two years old, after her father began limestone quarrying in West Asia. She attended an American school. After the outbreak of the first Gulf War, Dewan was enrolled in an English boarding school. She majored in finance at Wharton Business School, graduating in 1998. She joined Citigroup.

Career 
Dewan worked as an investment banker before setting up her own vertical integrated design business, Ka Design Atelier. In 2011 she oversaw the design and creation of the Guinness World Records' largest marble mosaic - a full-size portrait of Qaboos bin Said al Said. It included 128,274 individual marble pieces and took 3,792 hours to construct. The marble tiles were mined from the Omani territories Wilayat Mahdha, Wilayat of Ibra, Wilayat of Ibri, Sadeh Beach and Quryat Beach.

Dewan was reading a newspaper in New Delhi when she found out that proposals were underway to develop Indira Gandhi International Airport. She decided to bid for the design, and her company won. She went on to design the Chhatrapati Shivaji International Airport. Dewan has designed houses and two of the luxury yachts of the Sultan of Oman. She designed the stone paneling system for The Leela Palace. She was included in the Wharton magazine 40 Under 40. In 2012 she opened the Iron Curtain restaurant in New Delhi, which was home to an area to screen films. In 2015 she gave the keynote lecture at Innovation Dubai. She was recognised as a Young Global Leader by the World Economic Forum in 2016. In 2017 she was part of a United Nations global initiative that connected 300 Indian leaders. She is concerned about bribery and bureaucratic red tape in India.

Awards and honours

References 

People from Kolkata
Wharton School of the University of Pennsylvania alumni
Interior designers
Indian businesspeople
21st-century Indian businesspeople
Living people
Year of birth missing (living people)